Sir Frederick Thomas Sargood  (30 May 1834 – 2 January 1903) was an Australian politician, Minister of Defence and Education in the Government of Victoria 1890–1892 and Senator in the Australian Senate 1901–03.

Early life
Sargood was born in Walworth, London, the eldest child of Frederick James Sargood (later a member of the old Victorian Legislative Council), and Emma, daughter of Thomas Rippon, Chief Cashier of the Bank of England. F. T. Sargood was educated at private schools and arrived with his family aboard the Clifton in Melbourne on 12 February 1850. He initially worked as a clerk in the Public Works Department, but in 1851 joined his father's softgoods business, Sargood, King & Co., and in 1859 became a junior partner in it. In the same year he joined the Victorian volunteer artillery as a private and eventually reached the rank of lieutenant-colonel. He also took an interest in rifle shooting. In 1858 Sargood married Marian Australia, daughter of George Rolfe, later a politician.

Political career
In May 1874 Sargood entered the Victorian Legislative Council by winning a by-election for Central Province, and in 1875 he became the first chairman of the Melbourne Harbor Trust. Sargood was a commissioner of savings banks in 1874–80. Sargood's wife Marian died in childbirth on 6 January 1880; he resigned from the council and visited England later the same year with his nine children. Sargood was appointed a delegate by the Victorian government to represent the colony before the Imperial Commission for the protection of British possessions abroad. Sargood married Julia Tomlin on 2 December 1880 on the Isle of Wight and returned to Melbourne in 1882.

Sargood held the Legislative Council Province of South Yarra from November 1882 to March 1901. In March 1883 Sargood became an Honorary Minister in the James Service government. In the same year when the Defence Department was formed, he was the first Minister of Defence, and carried through the reorganization of the defences which involved the changeover from volunteer to militia forces. Rifle clubs were formed and the important cadet corps movement for schoolboys was also due to Sargood's efforts. In 1885 he took the additional portfolio of Minister of Water-supply, and held both positions until the resignation of the ministry in February 1886. He was appointed Vice-President of the Melbourne Centennial Exhibition of 1888 and subsequently Executive Vice-President and Treasurer. Sargood was also president of the Melbourne Chamber of Commerce 1886–1888, and his name stood very high in the business world. When he joined his father's business it was a comparatively small one, but now under the name of Sargood Butler and Nichol it had become one of the largest in Australia, with branches in other cities. It was subsequently extended to New Zealand and before Sargood's death the number of employees was over 5000. When William Hearn died in 1888, Sargood became Leader of the Legislative Council, in which position he examined all bills coming from the Legislative Assembly and showed much critical ability. He joined the James Munro ministry in November 1890 as Minister of Defence and of Education, but withdrew when the ministry was reconstructed under William Shiels in February 1892, because he was unable to agree with Shiels's adhesion to the "one man one vote" principle.

Although Sargood' political leanings were conservative, he had piloted the first Factories Act through the Council with skill, and in his own firm, the Saturday half-holiday had been brought in as far back as 1852. Sargood joined the George Turner government in September 1894 as Minister of Defence, but about three months later again resigned on a question of principle. He again took up the position of Leader of the Council and had a prominent part in the Federation movement. His views on the tariff prevented his being elected as one of the Victorian delegates to the 1897 convention, but at the first federal election in 1901 he was elected as one of the senators for Victoria in spite of the opposition of the protectionist press. When the Senate met he was nominated for the position of President which, however, went to Sir Richard Baker by 21 votes to 12. Sargood, however, took a leading position in the Senate.

Late life and legacy

Sargood was created Companion of the Order of St Michael and St George (CMG) in 1885 and was knighted KCMG in 1890. He died suddenly while on a holiday in Taihape, New Zealand on 2 January 1903. He was the first serving Australian Senator to die in office. Lady Sargood survived him with five sons and four daughters of the first marriage, and one daughter of the second.

Sargood was prominently connected with many philanthropic and religious movements. 

The large Rippon Lea Estate in Elsternwick was originally built for Sargood in 1868.

One son, Frederick George Sargood, moved to Sydney and became a prominent retailer. He lived for a time in Rippon Grange, a mansion in Water Street, Wahroonga, which was designed by Howard Joseland. The Sargood family vault is located in Gore Hill cemetery, St Leonards.

References

1834 births
1903 deaths
Members of the Victorian Legislative Council
Australian federationists
People from Southwark
Politicians from Melbourne
English emigrants to colonial Australia
Australian Knights Commander of the Order of St Michael and St George
Australian politicians awarded knighthoods
Members of the Australian Senate
Members of the Australian Senate for Victoria
Free Trade Party members of the Parliament of Australia
19th-century Australian politicians
20th-century Australian politicians